Independence Day of Finland is a national public holiday, and a flag flying day, held on 6 December to celebrate Finland's declaration of independence from the Russian Empire when the Bolsheviks took power in late 1917.

History

The movement for Finland's independence started after the revolutions in Russia, caused by disturbances inside Russia from hardships connected to the First World War. This gave Finland an opportunity to withdraw from Russian rule. After several disagreements between the non-socialists and the social-democrats over who should have power in Finland, on 4 December 1917, the Senate of Finland, led by Pehr Evind Svinhufvud, finally made a Declaration of Independence which was adopted by the Finnish parliament two days later.

Independence Day was first celebrated in 1917. However, during the first years of independence, 6 December in some parts of Finland was only a minor holiday compared to 16 May, the Whites' day of celebration for prevailing in the Finnish Civil War. The left parties would have wanted to celebrate 15 November, because the people of Finland (represented by parliament) took power 15 November 1917. When a year had passed since declaration of independence, 6 December 1918, the academic people celebrated the day.

Observance

During the early decades of independence, occasion marked by patriotic speeches and special church services. From the 1970s onwards, however, Independence Day celebrations have taken livelier forms, with shops decorating their windows in the blue and white of the Finnish flag, and bakeries producing cakes with blue and white icing.

It is traditional for Finnish families to light two candles in each window of their home in the evening. This custom dates to the 1920s; but even earlier, candles had been placed in Finnish windows on poet Johan Ludvig Runeberg's birthday as a silent protest against Russian oppression. A popular legend has it that two candles were used as a sign to inform young Finnish men on their way to Sweden and Germany to become jägers that the house was ready to offer shelter and keep them hidden from the Russians.

State festivities
 
 
Official Independence Day festivities usually commence with the raising of the Finnish flag on Tähtitorninmäki ("Observatory Hill") in Helsinki. A religious service is held at Helsinki Cathedral, and official visits are made to the war memorials of World War II. Another event is the annual military parade by personnel of the Finnish Defense Forces, which is one of the big highlights and is a nationally televised event.

YLE, Finland's national public service broadcaster, broadcasts the movie adaptation of The Unknown Soldier, based on Väinö Linna's iconic novel. In most years, the original 1955 film has been shown (dozens of times) and every year since 2000; but the 1985 version has also been shown once—in 1997 and in addition to the 2017 version premiered in 2021. 

The traditional torch cavalcade by students has been held annually since 1951. The cavalcade is held in various towns and cities with a university and wreaths are placed on war graves.

In the evening, the Presidential Independence Day reception is held for approximately 2,000 invited guests at the Presidential Palace. This event, known informally also as Linnanjuhlat ("the Castle Ball"), is broadcast on national television and has been a perennial favourite of the viewing public. The first presidential ball was organized in 1919, and the event has been held most years since.

The reception invariably attracts the attention of demonstrators in support of various causes, and various demonstrations and shadow parties are held to coincide with the official event. The late philanthropist Veikko Hursti organized the most popular of these demonstrations, providing free food to the poor and underprivileged. Since Hursti's death in 2005, the tradition has been carried on by his son, Heikki Hursti.

The most popular television segment of the Independence Day reception is the entrance of the guests. These include persons who receive invitations every year, including the knights of the Mannerheim Cross (traditionally the first ones to enter), members of the government and the Parliament of Finland, archbishops, judges, high military and police officers, and various diplomats and dignitaries. The second group includes guests of the President's own choosing: typically entertainers; activists; sportspersons; and in general, people who have been in the spotlight over the past year. The last guests to enter are always the surviving former Finnish presidents.

90th anniversary commemorative coin
The 90th anniversary of Finland's Declaration of Independence was selected as the main motif for a high-value commemorative coin, the €5 90th Anniversary of Finland's Declaration of Independence commemorative coin, minted in 2007. The reverse shows petroglyphic aesthetics, while the obverse has a nine-oar boat with rowers, symbolizing collaboration as a true Finnish trait. Signs of music and Finnish kantele strings can be discerned in the coin's design.

100th anniversary

The centenary of Finland’s independence was celebrated in 2017. The theme was "Together."

Global illuminations
Country, city, site illuminated:
 Argentina, Buenos Aires, The Usina del Arte cultural centre
 Australia, Adelaide, Adelaide Town Hall
 Australia, Brisbane, Story Bridge and Victoria Bridge
 Australia, Canberra, Telstra Tower, the Old Parliament House, Malcolm Fraser Bridge, Questacon – The National Science and Technology Centre (Parkes)
 Australia, Hobart, Railway Roundabout Fountain, Elizabeth Street Mall and the Kennedy Lane Tourism Precinct
 Australia, Perth, The Council House building and Trafalgar Bridge
 Austria, Vienna, The Wiener Riesenrad Ferris wheel
 Brazil, Rio de Janeiro, The Christ the Redeemer statue
 Bulgaria, Sofia, The National Palace of Culture
 Canada, Niagara Falls
 Cyprus, Nicosia, The White Walls building
 Czech Republic, Prague, The Dancing House designed by Frank Gehry
 Estonia, Tallinn, Stenbock House (The seat of the Government)
 Estonia, Tartu, The Vanemuine Theatre, Võidu sild Bridge,
 Ethiopia, Addis Ababa, Lion of Judah monument in front of the Ethiopian National Theatre
 Greece, Athens, The Arch of Hadrian
 Hungary, Budapest, Elizabeth Bridge
 Iceland, Reykjavik, Harpa Concert Hall and Conference Center
 Ireland, Dublin, Mansion House, the residence of the Lord Mayor of Dublin
 Italy, Rome, The Colosseum
 Kazakhstan, Astana, The bridges across the Ishim River, St. Regis hotel
 Latvia, Jelgava, Railway Bridge
 Latvia, Riga, The Tower of the Town Hall in the Old Town, the Railway Bridge across the Daugava river
 Lithuania, Vilnius, Three Crosses monument
 Mexico, Mexico City, The Angel of Independence monument (Ángel de la Independencia)
 Mozambique, Maputo, Maputo Fortress
 Netherlands, Alkmaar, Stadskantine Alkmaar
 Norway, Oslo, Holmenkollen ski jumping hill
 Poland, Warsaw, The Palace of Culture and Science
 Portugal, Lisbon, Belém Tower (a UNESCO World Heritage Site)
 Russia, Lumivaara, Lumivaara Church
 Russia, Moscow, The Embassy of Finland
 Russia, Petrozavodsk, The National Theatre
 Russia, Saint Petersburg, The Museum of Ethnography
 Serbia, Belgrade, Ada Bridge, Palace Albania
 Sweden, Stockholm, Globen
 Switzerland, Montreux, The Mannerheim memorial
 Ukraine, Kyiv, The Embassy of Finland
 United Kingdom, Newcastle, The Gateshead Millennium Bridge

See also
 History of Finland
 Independence Day Reception (Finland)
 Timeline of Independence of Finland (1917–1920)

References

External links

December observances
1917 establishments in Finland
Finland
Public holidays in Finland
Finnish flag flying days